Nepenthes pervillei (after Auguste Pervillé, French plant collector) is the only pitcher plant found in the Seychelles, where it is endemic to the islands of Mahé and Silhouette. It grows in rocky areas near granitic mountain summits, its roots reaching deep into rock fissures. The species has an altitudinal range of 350–750 m above sea level. Like all members of the genus, N. pervillei is dioecious, having separate male and female plants.

The mite Creutzeria seychellensis has been found in the pitchers of N. pervillei.

Taxonomy
The species was originally described as Nepenthes pervillei in 1852, but was later placed in the monotypic genus Anurosperma as Anurosperma pervillei, based on the morphology of its seeds, which differ from the closely allied N. madagascariensis (and the other members of Nepenthes) in that they lack the 'tails' characteristic of the rest of the genus. However, the more recent taxonomic database of Jan Schlauer subsumes Anurosperma back into Nepenthes.

Long considered one of the more "primitive" species of Nepenthes, recent molecular phylogenies have consistently placed N. pervillei in a basal position within the genus.

Gallery

References

Further reading

 Bauer, U., C.J. Clemente, T. Renner & W. Federle 2012. Form follows function: morphological diversification and alternative trapping strategies in carnivorous Nepenthes pitcher plants. Journal of Evolutionary Biology 25(1): 90–102. 
  Blondeau, G. 2001. Nepenthes Pervillei. In: Les Plantes Carnivores. De Vecchi, Paris. pp. 71–72.
 Fashing, N.J. 2010.  In: M.W. Sabelis & J. Bruin (eds.) Trends in Acarology: Proceedings of the 12th International Congress. Springer Science, Dordrecht. pp. 81–84. 
 Hartmeyer, S. 1993.  Carnivorous Plant Newsletter 22(3): 65–70.
 Jean, S.M. 2015. Less than 1,000 meat-eating plants found on Seychelles, report says. Seychelles News Agency, 27 December 2015. 
 Kitching, R.L. 2000. Food Webs and Container Habitats: The natural history and ecology of phytotelmata. Cambridge University Press, Cambridge.
 Kitching, R.L. & C.J. Schofield 1986. Every pitcher tells a story. New Scientist 109(1492): 48–50.
 Malcomber, S.T. 1989. A survey of the Nepenthes pervillei communities in the Seychelles September 1989. [Sine nomine, sine loco.] 
  Mansur, M. 2001.  In: Prosiding Seminar Hari Cinta Puspa dan Satwa Nasional. Lembaga Ilmu Pengetahuan Indonesia, Bogor. pp. 244–253.
 Redwood, G.N. & J.C. Bowling 1990. Micropropagation of Nepenthes species. Botanic Gardens Micropropagation News 1(2): 19–20.
  Schmid-Hollinger, R. N.d. Nepenthes pervillei: Blütenbau. bio-schmidhol.ch. 
  Schmid-Hollinger, R. N.d. Nepenthaceae: Axile oder parietale Placentation? bio-schmidhol.ch. 
  Schmid-Hollinger, R. N.d. Kannendeckel (lid). bio-schmidhol.ch. 
 Nepenthes pervillei and the Seychelles Odyssey by Colin Clayton of Triffid Park. Triffid Park. 

Carnivorous plants of Africa
Coprophagous plants
pervillei
Endemic flora of Seychelles
Plants described in 1852